is a Japanese politician and a former member of the House of Representatives of Japan representing Okinawa 4th district (southern Okinawa Island and the Sakishima Islands). Before he entered national politics, Nakasato was a member of the Okinawa Prefectural Assembly for 16 years. He served as the Speaker of the Assembly from 2006 until his retirement from prefectural politics in 2008. He is opposed against the construction of a US base in Yonaguni and the relocation of the Futenma air base within Okinawa Prefecture.

References 

1937 births
Living people
People from Okinawa Prefecture
Members of the House of Representatives (Japan)
21st-century Japanese politicians
Members of the Okinawa Prefectural Assembly